Pierre Lepape (1941 – 18 December 2021) was a French journalist, writer, and literary critic.

References

1941 births
2021 deaths
20th-century French writers
21st-century French writers
French literary critics
People from Eure